Aleksei Yuryevich German (20 July 193821 February 2013) was a Soviet Russian film director and screenwriter. In a career spanning five decades of filmmaking, German completed six feature films, noted for his stark pessimism, long, serpentine sequence shots, black and white cinematography, overbearing sound design and acute observations of Stalinist Russia.

Biography
German was born in Leningrad (now St. Petersburg, Russia) in 1938; his father was the writer Yuri German.  He studied under Grigori Kozintsev until 1960, and then moved on to working in theatre before joining the Lenfilm studio as an assistant director. He made his directing debut with Sedmoy Sputnik, co-directed with Grigori Aronov in 1967. 
Over the course of his career, many of his projects met with production difficulties or official opposition; in 50 years, he managed to complete just six feature films, his final film being the science fiction film Hard to Be a God, completed by his son, Alexei German  after his death, debuted at the Rome Film Festival in 2013.

Trial on the Road (1971) is the film that made Alexei German famous. It was banned for fifteen years and was shelved by the Ministry of Culture of the Soviet Union until its release (1986) during the Gorbachev era.

In 1987, at the Rotterdam International Film Festival (Netherlands), Alexei German, as a director, received a KNF Award for his three films, Trial on the Road, Twenty Days Without War, and My Friend Ivan Lapshin.

German was married to the screenwriter Svetlana Karmalita; they had a son, Aleksei Alekseivich German, who is also a film director. German died of heart failure 21 February 2013.

Style
Most of German's films are set during the Joseph Stalin era and the Second World War, and they depict the time period in a critical light. His films, shot mostly in black and white or very muted color, have a distinctive "murky" look and are often described as looking "aged." He was known for his obstinacy as a director, for featuring protagonists who could be categorized neither as heroes nor antiheroes, and for casting actors against type.

Filmography

As director
1967 – Sedmoy sputnik (The Seventh Companion)
1971 – Proverka na dorogakh (Trial on the Road)
1976 – Dvadtsat dney bez voyny (Twenty Days Without War)
1984 – Moy drug Ivan Lapshin (My Friend Ivan Lapshin)
1998 – Khrustalyov, mashinu! (Khrustalyov, My Car!)
2013 – Trudno byt' bogom (Hard to Be a God) (original title History of the Arkanar Massacre)

References

External links

War and Remembrance: The Films of Aleksei Guerman
 The Strange Case of Russian Maverick Aleksei German, by Anton Dolin
  "Time Unfrozen: The Films of Aleksei German,"  New Left Review 7, Jan.-Feb. 2001. by Tony Wood
 Exorcism: Aleksei German Among the Long Shadows, by J. Hoberman
 Shooting Down Pictures article 

1938 births
2013 deaths
Mass media people from Saint Petersburg
Russian film directors
Soviet film directors
Recipients of the USSR State Prize
Recipients of the Nika Award
Burials at Bogoslovskoe Cemetery
20th-century Russian screenwriters
Male screenwriters
20th-century Russian male writers
Soviet screenwriters